Tempe Girl is the name given to an unidentified decedent whose body was discovered on April 27, 2002 in Tempe, Arizona. She had died of cocaine intoxication—ruled to be neither an accident nor a homicide—one day before the discovery of her body. This decedent is believed to have been of either Hispanic or Native American ethnicity and was allegedly picked up while hitchhiking, claiming she had been effectively disowned by her own mother for her frequent recreational drug use.

This unidentified decedent became known as Tempe Girl due to the city in which her body was discovered. Her official case number is 02-1368. As of 2023, Tempe Girl is undergoing genealogical research conducted by the DNA Doe Project in ongoing efforts to discover her identity.

Discovery
On April 27, 2002, the fully clothed body of a teenage female was discovered in the vicinity of 1850 East University Drive, close to the Arizona State University, in Tempe, Arizona. She had been deceased for less than 24 hours before the discovery of her body.

Close to the body of the decedent, investigators located a compact disc, from which they were able to retrieve several clear fingerprints which, via an examination of police records, were identified as belonging to a woman living in Phoenix, Arizona.

Autopsy 
Tempe Girl was aged between 15 and 19 years old at the time of her death, and was five feet one inch in height. She weighed between 120 and 125 pounds, and was most likely of Hispanic ancestry, although her actual heritage may have been Native American.

The decedent had brown eyes and black hair which was 12 inches in length, extending past her shoulders by several inches. She wore a red halter top, blue jeans with a distinctive hollow silver medallion pattern, a side zipper, and eyelets upon the waistband, blue underwear, one wedge black high heel shoe (size 6.5), and a purple elastic hair tie upon her wrist. In addition, the decedent had an L-shaped scar measuring approximately one inch in length on the back of her left hand; this scar was vertical, and extended beneath her pinky and ring fingers toward her wrist. She also had a scar on her left shoulder. The decedent also wore faded purple nail polish on her fingernails. Her dental charts, DNA, and fingerprints yielded no results matching her to any known missing person.

Initially, investigators suspected the cause of death of the decedent to be foul play, although this theory was quickly disproven through both the subsequent formal questioning of witnesses, and discovering via the official coroner's report that the official cause of death had been acute cocaine intoxication. The ultimate nature of this case was never determined, as the autopsy conducted upon the decedent did not reveal if she had been murdered or had died by a form of misadventure.

Investigation
The clothing Tempe Girl had worn did not assist investigators in determining her identity, as all manufacturing brands were either common or could not be determined.

Upon discovering that the fingerprints upon the compact disc located close to the decedent's body belonged to a woman living in Phoenix, investigators interviewed this individual. The woman claimed to have no knowledge about the decedent, although her boyfriend confirmed to investigators that he had observed this girl hitchhiking alone near 32nd Street and Greenway Road in Phoenix on April 26, and that he had offered her a ride to her intended destination of Tempe. According to this eyewitness, the girl had been hitchhiking from Phoenix to Tempe with an expressed intention of purchasing tickets for an upcoming music concert.

April 26, 2002
According to the woman's boyfriend, the girl had voluntarily entered his vehicle in the vicinity of 32nd Street and Greenway Road on April 26. The young woman had conversed solely in Spanish as she rode in his vehicle, and had furthermore informed this individual that she had recently been effectively disowned by her own family due to her habitual recreational drug use. He had driven her to Tempe, where the decedent had initially stated she intended to purchase tickets for a music concert, although en route, she had changed her mind and asked the man if he was able to obtain drugs, to which he replied in the affirmative.

After the driver had picked up a second individual—whom he had known as a drug dealer—the young woman had spent her money on cocaine from this individual instead of purchasing tickets.

Shortly after the decedent ingested the cocaine, she reportedly developed a negative reaction to the drug, causing her to experience acute convulsions. The driver claimed that he and his other passenger drove to a parking lot behind a nearby shopping mall located in the area of 1850 East University Drive, close to the Arizona State University, where he then removed the girl—deceased or otherwise—from the back seat of his car before instructing the passenger who had sold her the drug to dial 911 at a nearby gas station. He then simply drove away from the scene, making no attempt to contact police or paramedics himself.

At 5:40 a.m. the following day, Tempe Girl's body was found lying in situ behind a shopping mall.

The driver of the vehicle in which Tempe Girl had allegedly ingested the cocaine was never prosecuted, as the medical examiner was uncertain either if the decedent had been under 18 at the time of her death; whether she was still alive at the time she left his vehicle; or if she had been either pushed or dragged from the vehicle to the location of her discovery.

Ongoing investigation
Tempe investigators did subsequently search through numerous schools in Arizona for leads pertaining to any female known to be missing whose physical features matched her description. All these lines of inquiry, however, failed to uncover the identity of Tempe Girl. In addition, the Tempe Police Department have maintained contact with Mexican investigators, suspecting the decedent may possibly have been an immigrant.

The National Center for Missing & Exploited Children and other institutions have created forensic facial reconstructions of Tempe Girl to illustrate estimations of how she may have appeared in life. Three missing people have thus far been ruled out as being the decedent. In addition, the woman's fingerprints, dental records, DNA and other identifying information have been entered into national identity databases, including the Combined DNA Index System and the National Crime Information Center, although to date, all efforts to identify Tempe Girl have proven unsuccessful.

In 2022, the DNA Doe Project announced their intention to determine the identity of Tempe Girl via genealogical research.

See also
 Cold case
 Crime in Arizona
 List of unsolved deaths
 The Doe Network

Notes

References

Further reading

External links
 2010 online news article appealing for information pertaining to Tempe Girl's identity
 National Center for Missing & Exploited Children case file pertaining to Tempe Girl
 
 

1980s births
2002 deaths
2002 in Arizona
20th-century Native American women
21st-century Native American women
20th-century Native Americans
21st-century Native Americans
Cocaine-related deaths in Arizona
Hispanic and Latino American people
People from Phoenix, Arizona
People from Tempe, Arizona
Unidentified American children
Unidentified decedents in Arizona
Unsolved deaths in the United States
Violence against women in the United States